Onchimira is a genus of sea slugs, dorid nudibranchs, shell-less marine gastropod molluscs in the family Onchidorididae.

Species 
 Onchimira cavifera Martynov, Korshunova, Sanamyan & Sanamyan, 2009

References

Onchidorididae